The granular poison frog or granular poison arrow frog (Oophaga granulifera) is a species of frog in the family Dendrobatidae, found in Costa Rica and Panama. Originally described as Dendrobates granuliferus, it was moved to Oophaga in 1994. Its natural habitats are tropical humid lowland forests; it is threatened by habitat loss.

Description
Its skin is finely granulated and its colour is typically bright orange head, body and upper arms and bluish-green underparts, legs and lower arms. In the vicinity of Quepos, Costa Rica, there is a colour morph in which the orange colour is replaced with olive green.

Distribution and habitat
The granular poison frog is native to Costa Rica and Panama. It also occurs in Piedras Blancas National Park in south-eastern Costa Rica. It inhabits the leaf litter of the floor of humid low altitude forests.

Behaviour
The granular poison frog is a diurnal terrestrial species. Breeding takes place in the rainy season and the female lays groups of three or four eggs in curled up dead leaves, under stones, in twig forks and in leaf axils just above the ground. The male guards the eggs and keeps them moist with his urine. When they hatch, the female carries the tadpoles singly to temporary water bodies such as hollows in trees, leaf axils of species such as Dieffenbachia and to bromeliads, at heights of a metre or two off the ground. The volume of water in these cavities averages . The female feeds the tadpoles on an ongoing basis by laying unfertilised eggs in the water bodies.

The frog is an aposematic animal, and it uses poison only for self-defense from predators. Its bright colors are used as a warning signal to all possible predators. Experimental studies in Costa Rica suggest the male granular poison frog spends the majority of its time and energy defending its calling site. These warning signals are more vocal (acoustic) than visual. If an encroaching male dared to approach too closely, a fight could ensue.

Status
The IUCN has listed this species as being "Vulnerable" because its range is relatively small, its numbers seem to be declining and it is threatened by destruction of its rainforest habitat.

References

External links
 
 

Oophaga
Frogs of North America
Aposematic species
Amphibians of Costa Rica
Amphibians of Panama
Amphibians described in 1958
Taxa named by Edward Harrison Taylor
Taxonomy articles created by Polbot